Giovani Anastasi (Senigallia, 20 March 1653 - Macerata, 13 March 1704) was an Italian painter, mainly of religious and history paintings.

References
He painted portraits in Senigallia of Cardinal legates Giacomo Cantelmo (1690) and Altieri (1697). He also painted the Miracles of St Phillip (1861) for church of san Filippo in Ostra.He painted a Glory of Saint Ursula on the cupola of the Church of Sant'Orsola in Pergola. His master works include 13 large frescoes in the Cloister of San Nicola in Tolentino, completed with the quadratura painter Agostino Orsini of Bologna with whom he also worked in Pergola. Works by Anastasi are also found in Fossombrone, San Costanzo, and Urbino. He died while completing decoration of the ceiling of Palazzo de Vico in Macerata.

Other sources cite a (1540–1587), painter, follower of Giulio Romano, active mainly in Mantua.

References

People from Senigallia
1653 births
1704 deaths
17th-century Italian painters
Italian male painters
18th-century Italian painters
18th-century Italian male artists